Summer of Secrets may refer to:
 Summer of Secrets (film), a 1976 film directed by Jim Sharman
 Summer of Secrets (novel), a 2007 novel by Rosie Rushton